The Regional Water Polo League (abbr. RWP), commonly known as the Regional League or Adriatic League, is a regional water polo league in Southeast Europe. Originally, the league featured clubs from Croatia, Montenegro, and Slovenia. In later years, clubs from Serbia joined the league and in one season club from Italy participated in the league.

History
The league was established in 2008 as the "Adriatic Water Polo League" and the inaugural 2008–09 season consisted of clubs from Croatia, Montenegro and Slovenia. Members of the inaugural season were Jug, Mladost, Primorje, POŠK, Jadran Split, Medveščak Zagreb, Šibenik, Mornar, Jadran, Primorac, Budva, and Koper. The first league champions were VK Jug.

In the 2009–10 season, Cattaro joined the league and the Final Four was introduced into the league. In the 2011–12 season, the Italian water polo club Pro Recco request to join the Adriatic League was granted and immediately in their first season they became champions, but left the league after the season. The Serbian clubs (Partizan, Crvena zvezda, Radnički and Vojvodina) joined the league in the 2014–15 season.

Starting from the 2015–16 season, second-tier Regional League A2 was introduced.

In February 2019, three team members of Serbian club Crvena zvezda were attacked in Split by Croatian ultra-nationalists, before regional league game against Mornar. The incident was condemned by Croatian and Serbian public, and by many organizations and officials as well. Following the incident, the Water Polo Federation of Serbia and Serbian clubs in competition sought to not play any further games in Split, and competition's Board of Directors made a decision to postpone any further games in Split in which Serbian clubs are included.

Starting with the 2020–21 season, the league is played in different format due to the COVID-19 pandemic, having two groups (2020–21 season with host cities being Belgrade and Dubrovnik, and 2021–22 season with host cities Belgrade and Split) and final tournament (2020–21 host being Zagreb, and 2021–22 host being Belgrade); In 2020–21 season, the Serbian club Radnički eventually won their first championship, thus ending 8-year dominance of the Croatian clubs. In 2021–22 season, the newcomer to the competition, Novi Beograd, lifted its maiden trophy.

Current clubs

Clubs that participate in the 2022–23 season:

Regional Water Polo League

All-time participants
The following is a list of clubs who have played in the Regional Water Polo League at any time since its formation in 2008 to the current season. A total of 22 clubs from five countries have played in the top-tier of the Regional League.

Finals 

note In 2008–09 season, the league was played in a round-robin tournament format.

Awards

Records and statistics

Performance by clubs

By country

References

External links
 

Adriatic
Water polo competitions in Croatia
Water polo competitions in Serbia
Water polo competitions in Montenegro
Water polo competitions in Slovenia
2008 establishments in Europe
Sports leagues established in 2008
Multi-national professional sports leagues